Häpna! (meaning Be amazed! in English) was a Swedish science fiction magazine published between March 1954 and 1969 by Grafiska Förlaget Kindberg & Söner AB in Jönköping. The first issue of the magazine was subtitled Science Fiction Tidsdrift, but it was changed to Science Fiction Teknishka Aventyr by the second issue.

Karl G. Kindberg was the publisher of the magazine. It was published each month up to January 1965, then irregularly until January 1966; the final year, 1969, an attempt was made to revive the magazine which led to the final four issues. The editor was Kjell Ekström, except for the final year when Sam J. Lundwall took over.

The content was some domestic material, but mostly anonymous translations of Ray Bradbury, Robert A. Heinlein and Isaac Asimov.

See also
 Science fiction magazine
 Fantasy fiction magazine
 Horror fiction magazine

References

1954 establishments in Sweden
1969 disestablishments in Sweden
Defunct magazines published in Sweden
Magazines established in 1954
Magazines disestablished in 1969
Mass media in Jönköping
Monthly magazines published in Sweden
Science fiction magazines
Science fiction magazines established in the 1950s
Swedish-language magazines